Joseph Irvine  was an English footballer who played in the Football League for Accrington.

References

Date of birth unknown
Date of death unknown
English footballers
Accrington F.C. players
English Football League players
Association football forwards
19th-century births
Date of birth missing